The German 20th Infantry Division was an infantry division of Nazi Germany.

History 
The was established in 1934 under the cover name Reichswehrdienststelle Hamburg, and did not assume its bona-fide designation until the creation of the Wehrmacht was announced in October 1935. In the autumn of 1937 it was upgraded to a fully motorized division.

As the 20th Motorized Infantry Division the unit took part in the invasion of Poland as part of Heinz Guderian's XIX Corps. During that campaign the motorized divisions were found to be somewhat unwieldy, so afterward the 20th and other motorized divisions were reorganized to reduce their size by about a third, leaving them with six motorized infantry battalions organized into two regiments, plus ordinary divisional support units.

In May 1940 the division took part in the invasion of France, and remained there on occupation duty until April 1941, except for one brief period on reserve in Germany. In June 1941 it joined Operation Barbarossa under Army Group Centre. In September it was transferred to Army Group North, and it spent most of 1942 on the Volkhov Front. In December it was transferred back to Army Group Centre for the relief attempt at the Battle of Velikiye Luki.

In July 1943 it was redesignated as 20th Panzergrenadier Division; by that time it had been given an assault gun battalion to support its infantry. It remained on the Eastern Front for the remainder of the war and ended the war fighting in the Battle of Berlin under the LVI Panzer Corps.

Commanding officers
20th Infantry Division (mot.)
General der Infanterie Mauritz von Wiktorin, 10 November 1938 – 10 November 1940
General der Infanterie Hans Zorn, 10 November 1940 – 12 January 1942
Generalleutnant Erich Jaschke, 12 January 1942 – 3 January 1943
Generalmajor Georg Jauer, 3 January 1943 – 23 July 1943

20th Panzergrenadier-Division
Generalleutnant Georg Jauer, 23 July 1943 – 1 September 1944
Oberst Dr. Walter Kühn, (i.V.) 1 Sep 1944 –  September 1944
Generalleutnant Georg Jauer, September 1944 – 1 January 1945)
Generalmajor Georg Scholze, 1 January 1945 – 23 April 1945

References
Notes

Bibliography
 
 

0*020
Military units and formations established in 1934
1934 establishments in Germany
Military units and formations disestablished in 1945